The WLWT TV Tower is a free-standing lattice tower with triangular cross section used by WLWT located in Cincinnati, Ohio. Built in 1978, it replaced the original 570-foot tall WLWT tower built in 1948 at the same site on Chickasaw Street, in the Mount Auburn neighborhood of Cincinnati.

Stations

Television
TV stations that transmit from WLWT TV Tower include the following:

See also 
 Lattice tower
 List of tallest freestanding steel structures

References

Lattice towers
Radio masts and towers in Ohio
Buildings and structures in Cincinnati
Towers completed in 1978